Minuscule 82 (in the Gregory-Aland numbering), O1 (Soden), is a Greek minuscule manuscript of the New Testament, on parchment leaves. Paleographically it has been assigned to the 10th century. Formerly it was labelled by 10a, 12p, and 2r. It has marginalia.

Description 

The codex contains the text of the Acts, Catholic epistles, Paul, Rev., with a commentary, on 246 parchment leaves (size ). The text is written in one column per page, 28 lines per page. The manuscript is neatly written.

Text 

The Greek text of the codex is a representative of the Byzantine text-type. Aland placed it in Category V.

According to Scrivener its value in Apocalypse is considerable.

History 

The manuscript was examined and described by Wettstein, Scholz, and  Paulin Martin. It was used by Westcott and Hort.

C. R. Gregory saw the manuscript in 1885.

Formerly it was labelled by 10a, 12p, and 2r. In 1908 Gregory gave for it number 82.

It is currently housed in at the Bibliothèque nationale de France (Gr. 237), at Paris.

See also 

 List of New Testament minuscules
 Biblical manuscript
 Textual criticism

References

Further reading

External links 
 Minuscule 82 at the Encyclopedia of Textual Criticism

Greek New Testament minuscules
10th-century biblical manuscripts
Bibliothèque nationale de France collections